Felipe Dionisio Bracamonte (born in Buenos Aires, Argentina, died 4 January 2005) was an Argentine footballer who played as a forward for clubs of Argentina and Chile.

Honours
 Unión San Felipe 1966 (top scorer Chilean Championship)

References

External links
 

2005 deaths
Argentine footballers
Footballers from Buenos Aires
Association football forwards
Estudiantes de La Plata footballers
All Boys footballers
Quilmes Atlético Club footballers
Unión San Felipe footballers
Argentine expatriate footballers
Argentine expatriate sportspeople in Chile
Expatriate footballers in Chile
Year of birth missing